A Queen Is Born is a 2020 Brazilian television series. The premise revolves around aspiring drag queens and drag kings.

Cast 
 Phillip Jordan as Adla Davis
 Gloria Groove
 Alexia Twister
 Silvero Pereira as Gisele Almodóvar

References

External links
 
 

2020 Brazilian television series debuts
Brazilian reality television series
Portuguese-language Netflix original programming
Drag (clothing) television shows